The Kinked-Demand curve theory is an economic theory regarding oligopoly and monopolistic competition. Kinked demand was an initial attempt to explain sticky prices.

Theory
"Kinked" demand curves and traditional demand curves are similar in that they are both downward-sloping.  They are distinguished by a hypothesized concave bend with a discontinuity at the bend - the "kink."  Therefore, the first derivative point is undefined and leads to a jump discontinuity in the marginal revenue curve.  

Classical economic theory assumes that a profit-maximizing producer with some market power (either due to oligopoly or monopolistic competition) will set marginal costs equal to marginal revenue.  This idea can be envisioned graphically by the intersection of an upward-sloping marginal cost curve and a downward-sloping marginal revenue curve .  In classical theory, any change in the marginal cost structure or the marginal revenue structure will be immediately reflected in a new price and/or quantity sold of the item.  This result does not occur if a "kink" exists.  Because of this jump discontinuity in the marginal revenue curve, marginal costs could change without necessarily changing the price or quantity.

Formulation

The two seminal papers on kinked demand were written nearly simultaneously in 1939 on both sides of the Atlantic.  Paul Sweezy of Harvard College published "Demand Under Conditions of Oligopoly."  Sweezy argued that an ordinary demand curve does not apply to oligopoly markets and promotes a kinked demand curve. 

From Queen's College in Oxford, Robert Lowe Hall and Charles J. Hitch wrote "Price Theory and Business Behavior," presenting similar ideas but including more rigorous empirical testing, including a business survey of 39 respondents in the manufacturing industry.  

Hall and Hitch further present a hypothesis for the initial setting of prices; this explains why the "kink" in the curve is located where it is. They base this on a notion of "full cost" - marginal cost of each unit plus a percent of overhead costs or fixed costs with an additional percent added for profit.  They emphasize the importance of industry tradition in history in determining this initial price, noting further, "An overwhelming majority of the entrepreneurs thought that a price based on full average cost…was the ‘right’ price, the one which ‘ought’ to be charged."

Criticism
Others such as George Stigler have argued against kinked demand. His primary opposition is summarized in a Working Paper out of the Stanford University Economics Department by seminal authors Elmore, Kautz, Walls et al.

New classical economists, led by Chicago’s George Stigler, worked to discredit the kinked demand models. Stigler first argues that the kinked demand models are not useful, as Hall and Hitch’s model only explains observed phenomenon and is not predictive. He further explains that the kinked demand analysis only suggests why prices remain sticky and does not describe the mechanism that establishes the kink and how the kink can reform once prices change. Stigler also asserts that the model is unnecessary because Chicago theory already included allowances for short-run sticky prices due to collusion, menu costs, and regulatory or bureaucratic inefficiencies in markets.

Contemporary reformulation
Game theory and models of strategic interaction have largely replaced kinked demand to explain price dislocations and slowly adjusting prices.  For further information see:

Reading on contemporary applications
A Duopoly Price Game 
A Theory of Dynamic Oligopoly, Price Competition, Kinked Demand Curves, and Edgeworth Cycles 
 Competition in the Aluminium Industry 1945-58 
The Kinked Demand Curve: A Game-Theoretic Approach

Notes

References
 Bhaskar, V. 1988. "The Kinked Demand Curve: A Game-Theoretic Approach" International Journal of Industrial Organization Vol. 6, pp. 373-384. 
 Hall, R. and Hitch, C. 1939. "Price Theory and Business Behaviour" Oxford Economic Papers Vol. 2, pp. 12-45. 
 Maskin, E. and Tirole, J. 1988. "A Theory of Dynamic Oligopoly, II: Price Competition, Kinked Demand Curves, and Edgeworth Cycles" Econometrica Vol. 56, pp. 571-599. 
 Osborne, D. 1974. "A Duopoly Price Game" Economica Vol. 41, pp. 157-175. 
 Peck, M. 1961. Competition in the Aluminium Industry: 1945-58. Harvard University Press, Cambridge. 
 Reid, G. 1981. The Kinked Demand Curve Analysis of Oligopoly: Theory and Evidence. Edinburgh University Press, Edinburgh.
 Stigler, G. 1947. "The Kinky Oligopoly Demand and Rigid Prices" The Journal of Political Economy Vol. 55, pp. 432-449. 
 Stigler, G. 1978. "The literature of economics: the case of the kinked oligopoly demand curve" Economic Inquiry Vol. 16, pp. 185–204.
 Sweezy, P. 1939. "Demand Under Conditions of Oligopoly" The Journal of Political Economy Vol. 47, pp. 568-573.

Further reading
Bhaskar, V., S. Machin and G. Reid "Testing a Model of the Kinked Demand Curve." The Journal of Industrial Economics 39, no. 3 (March 1991): 241-254.
Borenstein, Severin. "Evolution of U.S. Airline Competition." The Journal of Economic Perspectives 6, no. 2 (Spring 1992):45-73.
"Economic focus: Sticky situations," The Economist, 11 November 2006, 88.
Elmore, Kautz, Walls et al."Kinked Expectations", Working Paper, Stanford University.
Greenwald, B., J.E. Stiglitz. "Keynesian, New Keynesian and New Classical Economics."  Oxford Economic Papers, n.s., 39, no.1 (March 1987): 119-133.
Jones, Kit. An Economist Among Mandarins: A biography of Robert Hall (1901-1988).  Cambridge: Cambridge University Press, 1994.
Meister, J. Patrick. "Oligopoly: An In-Class Economic Game." The Journal of Economic Education, vol. 30, no. 4. (Autumn, 1999): 383-391.
O'Brien, D.P. The Classical Economists Revisited. Princeton: Princeton University Press, 2004.
Primeaux, Walter J. and Mark R. Bomball. "A Re-examination of the Kinked Oligopoly Demand Curve." The Journal of Political Economy 82, no. 4 (1974): 851-62.
Primeaux, Walter J. and Mickey C. Smith. "Pricing Patterns and the Kinky Demand Curve."  The Journal of Law and Economics 19, no. 1 (1976):189-99.
Rothschild, K. W. "Price Theory and Oligopoly." The Economic Journal 57, no. 227 (September 1947): 299-320.
"Round Table on Monopolistic and Imperfect Competition." American Economic Review 27, no. 2. (June 1937): 324-326.
Sawyer, Malcolm. "Post-Keynesian and Marxian Notions of Competition: Towards a Synthesis." In Competition, Technology and Money: Classical and Post-Keynesian Perspectives, ed. Mark A. Glick, 3-22. Brookfield, VT: Edward Elgar Publishing Co., 1994.
Sen, Debapriya. "The Kinked Demand Curve Revisited." Economics Letters 84 (2004):99-105.
Simon, Julian L. "A Further Test of the Kinky Oligopoly Demand Curve." The American Economic Review 59, no. 5, (1969): 971-975.
Smith, Victor E. "Note on the Kinky Oligopoly Demand Curve." Southern Economic Journal 15, no.2, (1948): 205-210.
Stein, Jerome L. Monetarist, Keynesian, and New Classical Economics. Oxford: Basil Blackwell Publishing, 1982.
Managerial Economics. "G S Gupta"

Demand
Imperfect competition